Beverly Fishman (born 1955, Philadelphia, Pennsylvania) is an American painter and sculptor whose work explores science, medicine, and the body. She is a Guggenheim Fellow, a National Academy of Design Academician, an Anonymous Was a Woman awardee, and was Artist-in-Residence at Cranbrook Academy of Art between 1992 and 2019, where she was Head of the Painting Department.   Although best known for her painted reliefs based on the forms of drugs and pharmaceuticals, Fishman has consistently worked in multiple media, such as cast-resin and glass sculpture, as well as silkscreen painting on metal,  large-scale wall painting, and outdoor murals.  While Fishman's artworks often look abstract, they are based on appropriated shapes, patterns, and images drawn from the pharmaceutical and illicit drug industries as well as multiple forms of scientific and medical imaging. As she noted in 2017, "Although they look abstract, my paintings are tied to problems like attention-deficit disorder, opioid addiction, anxiety, and depression. Their forms connect them to the social problems of today."

Exhibitions

In 1986 her art was in the show Sydney Blum/Petah Coyne/Beverly Fishman at P.S. 122, New York. In 2002 she had a solo show at Galerie Jean-Luc & Takako Richard, the gallery which was formerly known as Gallery Oz and subsequently known as Galerie Richard. Her solo show Focus: Beverly Fishman was featured at the Eli and Edythe Broad Art Museum at Michigan State University.

The exhibition Beverly Fishman: Dose, curated by Nick Cave was exhibited in 2017. In 2018 she exhibited Chemical Sublime at Kavi Gupta Gallery in Chicago. In 2019, she exhibited Future Perfect at Kavi Gupta.

In 2020, she exhibited “I Dream of Sleep” at the Miles McEnery Gallery.

Related publications
Fishman's art has been the subject of major reviews by art critics Donald Kuspit and Jason Stopa in Art in America. Dorothy Mayhall published the exhibition catalog for the show Beverly Fishman: Paintings, Drawings and Sculpture, shown November 4 – December 6, 1985 at the Housatonic Museum of Art.

Fishman was interviewed by Leslie Wayne of the online magazine Art Critical about three solo shows: Pain Management at the Library Street Collective in Detroit, Michigan; Another Day in Paradise at the Abroms-Engel Institute for the Visual Arts in Birmingham, Alabama, and Dose, curated by Nick Cave at the CUE Foundation in NYC.In 2017 Zachary Small reviewed Beverly Fishman: Color Coding Big Pharma for art21 magazine,
and she was interviewed by Jason Stopa for Art in America'' magazine about her abstract art derived from a focus on pill and medication addictions. Stopa wrote that Fishman "creates powerful abstract paintings that address technology and the pharmaceutical industry" and adds, "Fishman is a painter with the concerns of a sculptor, making paintings that require high levels of production. Her studio practice includes manufacturing uniquely shaped supports and consulting with automotive paint specialists to get the background she needs to achieve industrial finishes."

Awards and honors
Fishman was awarded an Anonymous Was A Woman Award in 2018. Fishman received her BFA from Philadelphia College of Art (now the University of the Arts) in 1977. Fishman received her MFA degree from Yale University in 1980. At Yale she studied under Judy Pfaff and Elizabeth Murray. Her work is included in the Hallmark Collection.
She was awarded a Guggenheim Fellowship in 2005.

External links
Artist's personal website
Gallery website

References 

Living people
1955 births
Artists from Philadelphia
Yale University alumni
Cranbrook Academy of Art faculty
20th-century American women artists
21st-century American women artists
American women academics